ZigZag Street is a 1996 novel written by Australian writer Nick Earls. It was Earl's second novel and won the Betty Trask Award in 1998, which it shared with Kiran Desai's Hullaballoo in the Guava Orchard. It has been compared with the work of Nick Hornby.

It was adapted for the stage by Philip Dean in 2004, playing at the La Boite Theatre before touring other cities.

Plot summary 
Richard Derrington is a 28 year old corporate lawyer in Brisbane struggling to cope after his girlfriend, Anna, has left him. He lives on Zig Zag Street in the suburb of Red Hill, Brisbane, Queensland in his grandmother's former home. The novel follows his life over a six-week period as he continues to "mess things up", before finding new purpose and new love.

The novel features a number of Brisbane landmarks, including Broadway On the Mall, Park Road in Milton as well as the eponymous Zig Zag Street. It references British band The Smiths. Its reference to Tim Tam biscuits and other Queensland icons has made it a cultural favourite.

References 

1996 Australian novels
Novels set in Brisbane
Australian novels adapted into plays
English-language novels